Nyereria is a genus of braconid wasps in the family Braconidae. There are around 30 described species in Nyereria. Most species are found in Africa, a few in Asia.

Species
These 29 species belong to the genus Nyereria:

 Nyereria achaeus (de Saeger, 1944)
 Nyereria albicentrus (Long & van Achterberg, 2008)
 Nyereria ankaratrensis (Granger, 1949)
 Nyereria areatus (Granger, 1949)
 Nyereria bicolorata Long & van Achterberg, 2015
 Nyereria bifissa (de Saeger, 1944)
 Nyereria circinus (de Saeger, 1944)
 Nyereria epaphus (de Saeger, 1944)
 Nyereria flavotorquata (Granger, 1949)
 Nyereria forensis (Tobias, 1977)
 Nyereria ganges Rousse & Gupta, 2013
 Nyereria geometrae (Granger, 1949)
 Nyereria hiero (de Saeger, 1944)
 Nyereria ituriensis (de Saeger, 1941)
 Nyereria mayurus Rousse & Gupta, 2013
 Nyereria menuthias (Wilkinson, 1935)
 Nyereria mlanje (Wilkinson, 1929)
 Nyereria neavei (Wilkinson, 1929)
 Nyereria neleus (de Saeger, 1944)
 Nyereria nigricoxis (Wilkinson, 1932)
 Nyereria nioro (Risbec, 1951)
 Nyereria osiris (de Saeger, 1944)
 Nyereria proagynus (Hedqvist, 1965)
 Nyereria rageshri Sathe, 1988
 Nyereria taoi (Watanabe, 1935)
 Nyereria tereus (de Saeger, 1944)
 Nyereria triptolemus (de Saeger, 1944)
 Nyereria vallatae (Watanabe, 1934)
 Nyereria yenthuyensis (Long & van Achterberg, 2008)

References

Microgastrinae
Braconidae genera